Pomatias is a genus of small operculate land snails, terrestrial gastropod mollusks in the family Pomatiidae.

Species 
Species within the genus Pomatias include:
†Pomatias antiquus (Brongniart, 1810) 
†Pomatias arneggensis Wenz, 1923
 † Pomatias bisulcatoides (Roman, 1907) 
†Pomatias bisulcatus (Zieten, 1832)
Pomatias canariensis (d'Orbigny, 1840)
†Pomatias conicus (Klein, 1853)
†Pomatias consobrinus (Sandberger, 1875)
Pomatias elegans (Müller, 1774) - Round-mouthed Snail
 † Pomatias fuggeri (Tausch, 1886) 
Pomatias glaucus (G.B. Sowerby II, 1843)
 † Pomatias harmeri Kennard, 1909 
 † Pomatias hemiglyptus (Fontannes, 1884) 
Pomatias hyrcanum (Martens, 1874)
  † Pomatias jagici (Brusina, 1892) 
  † Pomatias kochi (Gaál, 1910)
Pomatias laevigatus (Webb & Berthelot, 1833)
Pomatias lanzarotensis (Wollaston, 1878)
Pomatias olivieri (Pfeiffer, 1846) - lives in Israel
Pomatias palmensis (Wollaston, 1878)
 † Pomatias praecurrens (De Stefani, 1880) 
Pomatias raricosta Wollaston, 1878
 † Pomatias reticulatus (Baily, 1858) 
 † Pomatias rhinoceronthophylus (Sacco, 1886) 
Pomatias rivularis (Eichwald, 1829)
†Pomatias schrammeni (Andreae, 1902)
 † Pomatias subpictus (Sinzov, 1883) 
 † Pomatias subpyrenaicus (Noulet, 1854) 
 † Pomatias sulculatus (Paladilhe, 1873) 
 † Pomatias szadeczkyi (Gaál, 1910) 
 † Pomatias turgidulus (F. Sandberger, 1872) 
†Pomatias ulmensis (K. Miller, 1907)
 † Pomatias vasconensis (Noulet, 1854) 
Synonyms
†Pomatias moguntinus Kadolsky, 1989: synonym of  † Neobembridgia moguntina Kadolsky, 1989 
Pomatias sulcatus (Draparnaud, 1801): synonym of Tudorella sulcata (Draparnaud, 1805)

References 

 Studer, S. (1789). Faunula Helvetica. Class VI. Vermes. Ordo III. Testacea. - In: W. Coxe, Travels in Switzerland, in a series of letters to William Melmoth, Esq., Volume III: 384-392. London (T. Cadell in the Strand).
 Partiot, L. (1848). Mémoire sur les Cyclostomes, 71 + 1 pp.
 Jekelius, E. (1944). Sarmat und Pont von Soceni (Banat). Memoriile Institutului Geologic al României. 5, 1–167, 65 pls.
 Kadolsky, D. (1989). Stratigraphie und Molluskenfaunen von "Landschneckenkalk" und "Cerithienschichten" im Mainzer Becken (Oberoligozän bis Untermiozän?). Stratigraphische, paläogeographische und paläoökologische Ergebnisse. Geologisches Jahrbuch, Reihe A. 110: 69-133.
 Bank, R. A. (2017). Classification of the Recent terrestrial Gastropoda of the World. Last update: July 16th, 2017.

External links 
  Johann Andreas Wagner 1897. Monographie der gattung Pomatias Studer.
 Draparnaud, J. P. R. (1801). Tableau des mollusques terrestres et fluviatiles de la France. Montpellier / Paris (Renaud / Bossange, Masson & Besson). 1-116
 Jan, G. (1830). Scientia naturalis cultoribus. Conspectus methodicus Testaceorum in collectione mea exstantium anno 1830. 8 pp. Parma

Pomatiidae
Gastropod genera
Taxonomy articles created by Polbot